KPR Kobierzyce is a women's handball team, based in Kobierzyce, founded in 1998. They are currently competing in the Ekstraklasa and Women's EHF European League.

Achievements 

 Ekstraklasa
 Bronze: 2022
 Polish Cup (Puchar Polski)
 Winners: 2022

Team

Current squad
Squad for the 2022–23 season

Goalkeepers
 1  Beata Kowalczyk
 94  Patrycja Chojnacka
Left wingers
 22  Mariola Wiertelak
Right wingers
 13  Natalia Janas
 23  Patrycja Koziol
Line players
2  Aleksandra Olek
 24  Zusanna Wazna
 29  Andjela Ivanović

Left backs
 32  Katarzyna Cygan
 55  Zorica Despodovska
 82  Karolina Wicik
Centre backs
 4  Aleksandra Kucharska
 9  Aleksandra Tomczyk
 11  Małgorzata Buklarewicz
 73  Alona Shupyk
 91  Vitoria Dos Santos de Macedo
Right backs
 25  Oliwia Domagalska

Transfers 
Transfers for the 2023-24 season

 Joining
 
 Leaving

References

See also
 Handball in Poland
 Sports in Poland

Polish handball clubs
Sport in Lower Silesian Voivodeship
Women's sports teams in Poland
Wrocław County